Gamelin may refer to:

People
Gamelin (bishop) (died 1271), Scottish bishop
Alexander Gamelin (born 1993), American ice dancer
Émilie Gamelin (1800–1851), Canadian social worker 
Jacques Gamelin (1738–1803), French artist
Maurice Gamelin (1872–1958), French general, in command at the start of World War II
Theodore Gamelin (born 1939), American mathematician

Other
 Gamelin (electoral district), Canada
 Ffordd Gam Elin, a Roman road in the Berwyn area in Wales